Zakri bin Hassan is a Malaysian politician. He was elected Perikatan Nasional MP for Kangar in the 2022 general election.

Election results

References

See also 
 Members of the Dewan Rakyat, 15th Malaysian Parliament

Living people
Year of birth missing (living people)
Place of birth missing (living people)
Members of the 15th Malaysian Parliament
21st-century Malaysian politicians
Malaysian United Indigenous Party politicians